Blood sugar regulation is the process by which the levels of blood sugar, the common name for glucose dissolved in blood plasma, are maintained by the body within a narrow range. This tight regulation is referred to as glucose homeostasis. Insulin, which lowers blood sugar, and glucagon, which raises it, are the most well known of the hormones involved, but more recent discoveries of other glucoregulatory hormones have expanded the understanding of this process. The gland called pancreas secrete two hormones and they are primarily responsible to regulate glucose levels in blood.

Mechanisms

Blood sugar levels are regulated by negative feedback in order to keep the body in balance. The levels of glucose in the blood are monitored by many tissues, but the cells in the pancreatic islets are among the most well understood and important.

Granule docking is an important glucose-dependent step in human insulin secretion that does not work properly in type 2 diabetes.

Glucagon
If the blood glucose level falls to dangerously low levels (as during very heavy exercise or lack of food for extended periods), the alpha cells of the pancreas release glucagon, a hormone which travels through the blood to  the liver, where it binds to glucagon receptors on the surface of liver cells and stimulates them to break down glycogen stored inside the cells into glucose (this process is called glycogenolysis).  The cells release the glucose into the bloodstream, increasing blood sugar levels. Hypoglycemia, the state of having low blood sugar, is treated by restoring the blood glucose level to normal by the ingestion or administration of dextrose or carbohydrate foods. It is often self-diagnosed and self-medicated orally by the ingestion of balanced meals. In more severe circumstances, it is treated by injection or infusion of glucagon.

Insulin
When levels of blood sugar rise, whether as a result of glycogen conversion, or from digestion of a meal, a different hormone is released from beta cells found in the islets of Langerhans in the pancreas. This hormone, insulin, causes the liver to convert more glucose into glycogen (this process is called glycogenesis), and to force about 2/3 of body cells (primarily muscle and fat tissue cells) to take up glucose from the blood through the GLUT4 transporter, thus decreasing blood sugar. When insulin binds to the receptors on the cell surface, vesicles containing the GLUT4 transporters come to the plasma membrane and fuse together by the process of endocytosis, thus enabling a facilitated diffusion of glucose into the cell. As soon as the glucose enters the cell, it is phosphorylated into glucose-6-phosphate in order to preserve the concentration gradient so glucose will continue to enter the cell. Insulin also provides signals to several other body systems, and is the chief regulator of metabolic control in humans.

There are also several other causes for an increase in blood sugar levels. Among them are the 'stress' hormones such as epinephrine (also known as adrenaline), several of the steroids, infections, trauma, and of course, the ingestion of food.

Diabetes mellitus type 1 is caused by insufficient or non-existent production of insulin, while type 2 is primarily due to a decreased response to insulin in the tissues of the body (insulin resistance). Both types of diabetes, if untreated, result in too much glucose remaining in the blood (hyperglycemia) and many of the same complications.  Also, too much insulin and/or exercise without enough corresponding food intake in diabetics can result in low blood sugar (hypoglycemia).

Hormones that influence blood glucose level

References 

Diabetes
Medical conditions related to obesity
Nutrition
Endocrinology